Arabis scabra, the Bristol rockcress, is a perennial flowering plant in the family Brassicaceae, native to the Bristol region, including the Avon Gorge. It grows in shallow soils, scree and rocky ledges. It has been introduced to other locations in England, with populations usually being short-lived, with the exception of Combwich, where it can still be found.

See also 

 List of Arabis species

References

scabra
Flora of England
Plants described in 1785
Taxa named by Carlo Allioni